Stomozoidae is a family of tunicates belonging to the order Aplousobranchia.

Genera:
 Stomozoa Kott, 1957

References

Aplousobranchia